The 2011 OFC U-20 Championship, was the 18th OFC Under 20 Qualifying Tournament, the biennial football championship of Oceania (OFC). It was held in Auckland, New Zealand from 21 to 29 April 2011. The winner qualified for the 2011 FIFA U-20 World Cup. Holders Tahiti failed to qualify for this tournament. New Zealand won this year's edition.

Participating teams

 (Host Nation)

Venues
The tournament was originally planned to be played at one venue, in the city of Auckland, the renovated football stadium Centre Park. However, due to wet conditions both semi-final matches, the third-place match, and the OFC final were moved to North Harbour Stadium.

Group stage
The official draw was held at OFC headquarters in the presence of OFC Technical Director Patrick Jacquemet, OFC Head of Competitions David Firisua and other OFC staff, on 30 March 2011. 
The top two teams from each group (one group has 4 teams, other has 3) qualify for the semi-finals, with group winners playing other group runners-up.

All kick-off times are local (UTC+12)

Group A

Group B

Knockout stage

Semifinals

Third place match

Final

Winners

New Zealand qualified for the 2011 FIFA U-20 World Cup.

Goal scorers
6 goals
 Jean Kaltak

4 goals

 Dakota Lucas
 Himson Teleda
 Pascal Chabot
 Didier Kalip

3 goals

 Jone Salauneune
 Andrew Bevin
 Nick Branch
 James Musa
 Marco Rojas
 Lap Embel

2 goals

 Cory Chettleburgh
 Nigel Dabinyaba
 Dennis Ifunaoa

1 goal

 Taalenuu Faavi
 Ismael Herrera
 Viliati Ratu
 Noa Vukica
 Pascal Kenon
 Ryan Cain
 Ethan Galbraith
 Zane Sole
 Adam Thomas
 Alwin Komolong
 Vanya Malagian
 Larry Sae
 Octav Meltecoin
 Moses Moli-Kalontang
 Brian Kaltack
 Kevin Shem
 Eddison Stephen

External links
OFC Site

2011
Under 20
2011 OFC U-20 Championship
OFC
2011 in youth association football